Ashfield-Croydon, an electoral district of the Legislative Assembly in the Australian state of New South Wales, was created in 1959 and abolished in 1968.


Election results

Elections in the 1960s

1965

1962

Elections in the 1950s

1959

References

New South Wales state electoral results by district